Ontario High School is a high school in Ontario, California. It is one of the twelve schools in the Chaffey Joint Union High School District.

History
In 1882, founders of the City of Ontario George and William Chaffey established the Chaffey College of Agriculture and an on-campus secondary school with assistance from the University of Southern California (USC). The local community was granted control of the secondary school in 1901 and named it Ontario High School. Ten years later, in 1911, the school was renamed to Chaffey High School.

The Ontario Jaguars' rival school is the Chaffey Tigers; their annual football game is known as "The Cat Bowl".

In 2014 the school was remodeled to include a modernized campus, a new two story building with 32 classrooms, and, for the first time in 47 years, a football stadium known as "Jaguar Stadium".

The current principal is Eduardo Zaldivar, preceded by Cary Willborn. OHS is currently the last high school with lockers in the Chaffey Joint Union High School District.

Campus
The campus has eight permanent classroom buildings, along with 34 portable classrooms, for a total of 110 separate classrooms, an auditorium, cafeteria and multi-purpose room, library, study room, gym, locker room facilities, two pools, and fine arts and vocational facilities. In 2014, an extensive modernization took place with the help of "Measure P", constructing a new campus, a 2 story building, solar panels in the parking lot, and a new stadium in which the school will be able to host its first home football games.

Academics
Ontario High School follows a standard California high school curriculum as defined by the California Department of Education's High School Graduation Requirements and tests students with the Standardized Testing and Reporting (STAR) program and the California High School Exit Exam.

Students have the opportunity to earn college credit through College Board Advanced Placement (AP) courses. In addition, Ontario High School has many honors classes, supports the Gifted and Talented Education (GATE) program and the National Honors Society, and participates in the nationwide Renaissance program.

Arts
Ontario High School supports a wide array of fine and performing arts including art, art history, music appreciation, drama, choir, dance, band, percussion, ceramics, and color guard classes.

Band, percussion, and color guard
Ontario High School's instrumentalists, percussionists, and color guard performers compete in the Southern California Judging Association (SCJA) circuit for marching season during the first three months of the academic year. For the remainder of the year the Color Guard competes as a "winter guard" against other guards while the instrument and percussion sections have their orchestral season. The band's major performances are the Holiday Showcase, Music Americana, and Pops! concerts. The Music Americana concert is unique because the band performs with the United States Marine Corps Band. The Color Guard also has several acts during the Holiday Showcase, the Pops! concerts, and their end of the year show, the Color Guard Spectacular.
For most of its history, the marching season group was known as the Ontario High School Jaguar Band and Color Guard. They won many awards in band tournaments and marched in several parades throughout southern California. At a point between 2000 and 2008, the group was renamed the Ontario High School Pride.

On November 1, 2008 the Ontario High School Pride entered the Surf City Open marching competition and won the highest "sweepstakes" awards and an invitation to the 2nd Annual California State Championship. This is the first time in its history that the combined marching band, percussion, and color guard competed in a state level competition. On November 22, 2008 the Ontario High School Pride won the 5A Division of the California State Championships for their performance titled "The Lion King Goes Broadway" and became the 2008 Division 5A California State Champions.

Long-time band director Dave Berry retired at the close of the 2008-2009 school year. Ontario High School hired alumni Elyse Doremus to replace him and carry on his legacy in the 2009-2010 school year.

Dance
The school's dance classes—Dance Fundamentals, Core 2, Dance production and Dance Company—perform an end-of-the-year show to songs such as Bad Romance by Lady Gaga, Heads Will Roll by the Yeah Yeah Yeahs, Fuego by The Cheetah Girls, We Got the Beat by The Go-Gos, Street Lights by Kanye West, Hush Hush by The Pussycat Dolls, Send Me On My Way by Rusted Root, The Beautiful People by Marilyn Manson, Scars by Kelis, What's This from Nightmare Before Christmas, and I Took the Night by Chelly.

Drama/Theatre

The school's drama productions are currently directed by University of LaVerne graduate Jessica Larson, M.Ed. Past performances include Elf: The Musical, The Curious Incident of a Dog in the Nighttime, Little Shop of Horrors, A Midsummer Night's Dream, Seussical: The Musical, The Terror Trilogy, Rumors, To Kill a Mockingbird, The Nerd, Touchtone "M" for Murder, Night of the Living Dead, Alice in Wonderland, Area 51 the Musical, The Brothers Grimm Spectaculathon You're a Good Man, Charlie Brown, The Legend of Sleepy Hollow, and The Complete Works of William Shakespeare Abridged.

Demographics
The Ontario High School student population is primarily Hispanic/Latino. Between 2005 and 2009, the number of students categorized as English Language Learners decreased slightly. During the same period came a sharp rise in the number of students participating in the Free/Reduced School Lunch program. This data is reported by the school district as part of their annual California Basic Educational Data System (CBEDS) submission. Enrollment figures are released annually by the California Department of Education.

2009
Student Enrollment: 2,841
Free/Reduced School Lunch: 55.9%
Socioeconomic Disadvantaged: 75.8%
English Language Learners: 26.4%
Census Characterization: Mid-size City
Ethnic Breakdown:
American Indian/Alaskan Native: 0.2%
Asian: 2.4%
Pacific Islander: 0.4%
Filipino: 0.5%
Hispanic/Latino: 85.8%
African American: 4.2%
White: 6.1%
Other/Declined to State: 0.5%

2005
Student Enrollment: 2,591
Free/Reduced School Lunch: 17.3%
English Language Learners: 29.8%
Census Characterization: Mid-size City
Ethnic Breakdown:
American Indian/Alaskan Native: 0.3%
Asian: 2.7%
Pacific Islander: 0.3%
Filipino: 0.7%
Hispanic/Latino: 77.6%
African American: 7.6%
White: 10.7%
Other/Declined to State: 1.2%

Clubs
Students and faculty members often work together to form clubs that serve the community and participate in extra-curricular activities.

Academic Decathlon
Anime Club is #1
AP Spanish Club
Asian Culture Club
Associated Student Body
Advancement Via Individual Determination (AVID)
Band
Band Booster Club
Beta Club
Black Student Union (BSU)
Boys Basketball
Boys Hip Hop
Boys Tennis
California Scholarship Federation
Cheerleading
Chess Club
Choral Music
Color Guard
Cross Country and Track
Dance Club
Drama Club
Drum Corps
Earth Club
Engineering Club
FBLA
FHA
Film Club
Foreign Language Club
Girls Basketball
Girls Tennis
Golfers Club
Geek Club
Interact Club
Jags 4 Jesus
Jag Law
Jag-Wire, the student newspaper (journalism)
Jaguar Marathon Club
Journalism Club
JSA (Junior State of America)
Judo Club
Karate and Self Defense
Key Club
Future Business Leaders of America
Future Homemakers of America
Letterman's Club
Lifeguard Club
Link Crew
MEChA (Movimiento Estudiantil Chicano de Aztlan)
Military Club "Stars and Stripes"
Mock Trial
Model United Nations
National Honor Society
ONCA, the OHS yearbook
Pacific Islander Club
Peer Counseling
Pep Squad
Ray's Power Pit, weight lifting and fitness
Renaissance
Science Club
Skills USA
Snowboarding and Ski Club
STAND
STRIVE
TV/Video Club
VICA
Virtual Enterprise
Video Game Club
Volleyball Club
Walk and Rollers

Events
Ontario High School holds dances including homecoming, prom, and Sadie Hawkins dance. Homecoming Dance themes include "Around the World in One Night" and "Circue Du Extravaganza." A recent Prom theme is "Midnight Masquarade." OHS has recently had its 5th annual Halloween Carnival in 2013. The staff and students from different clubs bring fun carnival games and also a variety of different foods they sell. Main event at the carnival is the 2 scary mazes, one is hosted in the OHS auditorium, and the second maze is hosted in building A. This event is open for all age groups.

Notable faculty and alumni
Like many high schools throughout Southern California, Ontario High School has its share of notable faculty and alumni.

Ralph Deleon, convicted terrorist
Caesar Garduno, November, 2020 promoted to Brigadier General in the Air National Guard.
Victor J. Glover, NASA astronaut of the class of 2013 and Pilot on the first operational flight of the SpaceX Crew Dragon to the International Space Station
Shelly Martinez, professional World Wrestling Entertainment/Extreme Championship Wrestling wrestler, actress, and model.
Al Newman, Major League Baseball player for the Minnesota Twins. Member of Twins 1987 and 1991 World Championship Teams.
Juan Roque, former football All American at Arizona State University as an offensive tackle, Outland Trophy and Lombardi Award finalist in 1996, All Pacific-10 Conference First Team 1995 and 1996, member of 11-0 1996 Team that played in the Rose Bowl on January 1, 1997, NFL football player with Detroit Lions 1997-1999, played for CFL with Toronto Argonauts in 2001, and Arizona State University Sports Hall of Fame Inductee in 2009.
Mike Sweeney, Major League Baseball player for the Kansas City Royals. Played for the 1991 varsity baseball team that won the CIF Southern Section state title with an undefeated 26-0 record.

Notes

External links
Ontario High School, maintained by the Chaffey Joint Union High School District
Ontario High School News & Events
Ontario High School Cross Country
Ontario High School Football Schedule

References

High schools in San Bernardino County, California
Public high schools in California
Educational institutions established in 1967
1967 establishments in California